Brownville can refer to a community in the United States:

Brownville, Maine
Brownville, Nebraska
Brownville, New Jersey
Brownville (town), New York
Brownville (village), New York
Brownville, Wisconsin

See also
Brownsville (disambiguation)